Lars Behrendt (born 28 September 1973) is a German bobsledder who competed from 1998 to 2002. He won two medals in the four-man event at the FIBT World Championships with a gold in 2000 and a silver in 2001.

References
Bobsleigh four-man world championship medalists since 1930
FIBT profile

1973 births
German male bobsledders
Living people